Yamil H. Kouri Jr. is an American philatelist who signed the Roll of Distinguished Philatelists in 2020. He serves as President of the Postal History Society.

In 2019, he won the Benjamin and Naomi Wishnietsky World Series Champion of Champions Award at the  2019 American Philatelic Society Stampshow in Omaha, Nebraska.

In 2020, he received the Luff Award for Exceptional Contributions to Philately.

References 

Living people
Year of birth missing (living people)
Place of birth missing (living people)
American philatelists
Signatories to the Roll of Distinguished Philatelists